Beryllium iodide is the inorganic compound with the formula BeI2. It is a hygroscopic white solid.

Reactions
Beryllium iodide can be prepared by reacting beryllium metal with elemental iodine at temperatures of 500 °C to 700 °C:
Be  +  I2  →  BeI2

Beryllium iodide is also formed when beryllium carbide reacts with hydrogen iodide in the gas phase:
Be2C  +  4 HI  →  2 BeI2  +  CH4

Beryllium iodide reacts with fluorine giving beryllium fluoride and fluorides of iodine, with chlorine giving beryllium chloride, and with bromine giving beryllium bromide.

Structure
Two forms (polymorphs) of BeI2 are known. Both structures consist tetrahedral Be2+ centers interconnected by doubly bridging iodide ligands.  One form consist of edge-sharing polytetrahedra.  The other form resembles zinc iodide with interconnected adamantane-like cages.

Applications
Beryllium iodide can be used in the preparation of high-purity beryllium by the decomposition of the compound on a hot tungsten filament.

References

Beryllium compounds
Iodides
Alkaline earth metal halides
Inorganic polymers